Amredin Mohammad Anwar Sharifi (born 2 July 1992) is an Afghan footballer who plays as a forward for Bangladesh Premier League football club Fortis FC and the Afghanistan.

Career
He joined Shaheen Asmayee in 2013.

In 2017, he scored four goals in 2017 Sheikh Kamal International Club Cup, making him the top goalscorer in the competition.

Bangladesh Police FC
On 30 November 2021, Sharifi made his debut for Bangladesh Police FC against Chittagong Abahani Limited during the 2021–22 Independence Cup group stage match. He scored his first for the club in the same competition against Sheikh Russel KC during the semifinals. On 7 March 2022, Sharifi scored a hattrick against newly promoted side Swadhinata KS, in the Bangladesh Premier League.

International career
He was selected for the national team of Afghanistan for the 2014 AFC Challenge Cup in Maldives. They will face Philippines, Turkmenistan and Laos. He scored his first goal for the national team against Pakistan in a friendly match on 6 February 2015

International goals
Scores and results list Afghanistan's goal tally first.

Honours

Afghanistan
SAFF Championship: 2013

Individual
Sheikh Kamal International Club Cup Top Scorer (1): 2017

References

 archive.ph
 The AFC.com - The Asian Football Confederation

Living people
1992 births
Afghan footballers
Afghanistan international footballers
Afghan expatriates in Iran
Shaheen Asmayee F.C. players
Association football midfielders
Footballers at the 2014 Asian Games
Asian Games competitors for Afghanistan
Tajikistan Higher League players
Bangladesh Police FC players
Bangladesh Football Premier League players